Urodeta falciferella is a moth of the family Elachistidae. It is found in Kenya.

The wingspan is 7.3–8.1 mm. The forewings are greyish brown, mottled with greyish-brown tips of scales and with slightly raised blackish-brown scales forming two small spots on the forewings. The fringe is brownish grey, mottled by a white transversal streak before the dark tips of some scales. The hindwings, including the fringe, are brownish grey.

Etymology
The species name refers to the shape of the signum and is derived from Latin falcifera (meaning carrying a scythe or sickle).

References

Endemic moths of Kenya
Elachistidae
Moths described in 2009
Moths of Africa